Ernest August, Duke of Schleswig-Holstein-Sonderburg-Augustenburg (30 October 1660 – 12 March 1731) was the second son of Duke Ernest Günther and his wife Auguste.

Ernest August converted to Catholicism and became a canon in Strasbourg.  However, he later reverted to Lutheranism.

In 1692, he succeeded his childless brother Frederick as Duke of Augustenburg.  In 1695 he married Baroness Maria Theresia of Weinberg.  This marriage remained childless.

Dukes of Schleswig-Holstein-Sonderburg-Augustenburg
1660 births
1731 deaths
17th-century German people
18th-century German people